Alpha Baltic–Unitymarathons.com was a Latvian road cycling team. Since 2011 it is a UCI Continental team. Between 2011 and 2013 the leading cyclist of the team was Estonian cyclist Erki Pütsep.

Major wins 
2011
Overall Baltic Chain Tour, Erki Pütsep
Team classification Baltic Chain Tour

Team roster
As of 24 June 2014.

References

External links
 Official website

Cycling teams based in Latvia